"Til I Get it Right" is a song recorded by American country music artist Tammy Wynette.  It was released in December 1972 as the second single from the album My Man.  The song was Wynette's twelfth number one, spending one week at number one and a total of twelve on the U.S. country singles chart.  The song was written by Red Lane and Larry Henley.

Cover version
The was recorded by Highway 101 and their 1991 album Bing Bang Boom.

Chart performance

References

1972 singles
Tammy Wynette songs
Highway 101 songs
Songs written by Larry Henley
Song recordings produced by Billy Sherrill
Epic Records singles
1972 songs
Songs written by Red Lane